The 18th Ryder Cup Matches were held 18–20 September 1969 at the Royal Birkdale Golf Club in Southport, England. The competition ended in a tie at 16 points each, when America's Jack Nicklaus conceded a missable three-foot (0.9 m) putt to Britain's Tony Jacklin at the 18th hole, in one of the most famous gestures of sportsmanship in all of sport. It was the first tie in Ryder Cup history, and the United States team retained the Cup.

The matches were marred by considerable acrimony and unsportsmanlike behavior by players on both sides. Britain's captain Eric Brown had instructed his players not to search for the opposition's ball if it ended up in the rough. American Ken Still, in the first-day foursomes, had deliberately and regularly stood too close to Briton Maurice Bembridge as he was putting. During one of the fourballs on the second day, both captains had to come out and calm down the warring players. This led to Nicklaus conceding Jacklin's final putt with the knowledge that the overall competition would end in a draw. Jacklin had won the Open Championship two months earlier at nearby Royal Lytham & St Annes to become the first British champion in eighteen years. After holing his final putt for par, Nicklaus picked up Jacklin's ball marker and told him, "I don't think you would have missed it, but I wasn't going to give you the chance, either."

Playing in his first Ryder Cup at age 29, Nicklaus' gesture became known as "the concession" and marked the beginning of a lasting friendship between the two that has spanned nearly a half century. It was the inspiration for The Concession Golf Club in Florida near Sarasota, which was co-designed by Nicklaus and Jacklin. The two were opposing captains in the competition in 1983 and 1987. While the concession is now viewed as one of the world's greatest acts of sportmanship, US captain, Snead, was furious that the chance of outright victory had been given away.

The U.S. team had only two players with previous Ryder Cup experience, Billy Casper and Gene Littler. The team was the only one that Arnold Palmer was not a member of from his first appearance in 1961 through his final appearance in 1973.

Format
The Ryder Cup is a match play event, with each match worth one point.  From 1963 through 1971 the competition format was as follows:
Day 1 — 8 foursomes (alternate shot) matches, 4 each in morning and afternoon sessions
Day 2 — 8 four-ball (better ball) matches, 4 each in morning and afternoon sessions
Day 3 — 16 singles matches, 8 each in morning and afternoon sessions
With a total of 32 points, 16 points were required to win the Cup, or 16 points were needed for the current champion to retain the Cup.  All matches were played to a maximum of 18 holes.

Teams
Source: 

This was the first Ryder Cup for Nicklaus, age 29. Despite having won his seventh major title as a professional in 1967, eligibility rules set by the PGA prevented him from competing in previous editions. He competed as a player through 1981, missing only the 1979 edition, and was the non-playing captain of the U.S. team in 1983 and 1987.

Thursday's matches

Morning foursomes

Afternoon foursomes

Friday's matches

Morning four-ball

Afternoon four-ball

Source:

Saturday's matches

Morning singles

Afternoon singles

Source:

Individual player records
Each entry refers to the win–loss–half record of the player.

Source:

Great Britain

United States

References

External links
PGA of America: 1969 Ryder Cup 
GolfCompendium.com: 1969 Ryder Cup

Ryder Cup
Golf tournaments in England
Sport in Lancashire
Sport in Southport
Ryder Cup
Ryder Cup
Ryder Cup
20th century in Lancashire